Conrad I the Elder (died about 864) was the count of several counties, most notably the Aargau and Auxerre, around Lake Constance, as well as Paris from 859 to 862/864. He was also the lay abbot of Saint-Germaine in Auxerre. Conrad's father was Welf. He was one of the early Welfs, a member of the Bavarian branch, and his sister Judith was the second wife of Louis the Pious.

In 858, he and his family, abandoned their sovereign Louis the German and went over to Charles the Bald, Judith's son. They were generously rewarded and Conrad was appointed to many countships. Louis the German confiscated his Bavarian fiefs and lands. 

The Miracula Sancti Germani calls Conrad Chuonradus princeps (prince, sovereign), when recording his marriage. By some accounts his wife re-married to Robert the Strong after his death.

Family

Between 834 and 838, Conrad married Adelaide of Tours, daughter of Hugh of Tours. They had:
Hugh
Conrad the Younger
Probably his son was also Welf I count of Alpgau and Linzgau in Swabia

References

Sources
199

876 deaths
9th-century people from West Francia
Dukes of Burgundy
Year of birth unknown